Alexander Tamanian (March 4, 1878 – February 20, 1936) was a Russian-born Armenian neoclassical architect, well known for his work in the city of Yerevan.

Life and work

Tamanian was born in the city of Yekaterinodar in 1878 in the family of a banker. He graduated from the St Petersburg Academy of Arts in 1904. His works portrayed sensitive and artistic neoclassical trends popular in those years. Some of his early works included the mansion of V. P. Kochubei in Tsarskoye Selo, 1911–1912; the house of Prince S. A. Scherbatov in Novinski Boulevard in Moscow, 1911–1913; the village railway employees housing and the tuberculosis sanatorium at the Prozorovskaya station (now Kratovo) near Moscow, 1913–1923; central workshops of Kazan railway in Lyubertsy, 1916).

He became an Academician of Architecture in 1914, in 1917 he was elected as the Vice-President of the Academy of Arts. In 1923 he moved to Yerevan, heading the new construction effort in the republic. He was the chief engineer of the local Council of People's Commissars and was a member of the CEC of the Armenian SSR (1925–1936), sponsored the construction industry, designed the layouts of towns and villages including Leninakan (now Gyumri) (1925), Stepanakert (1926), Nor-Bayazet (now Gavar) and Ahta-ahpara (both in 1927), Echmiadzin (1927–1928), and others. Tamanian created the first general plan of the modern city of Yerevan which was approved in 1924. Tamanian's style was instrumental in transforming what was essentially a small provincial city into the modern Armenian capital, a major industrial and cultural center. Neoclassicism dominated his designs but Tamanian also implemented a national flavor (red linings of tuff, traditional decorative carvings on stone etc.). Among his most famous designs in Yerevan are the hydroelectric station (ERGES-1, 1926), the Opera and Ballet house named after A. Spendiarian (1926–1953), the Republic Square (1926–1941) and others. He also played a major role in the development of restoration projects of historical landmarks in the country, chairing the Committee for the Protection of Historic Monuments in Armenia.

Tamanian was married to Camilla Edwards, a member of the Benois family. Their sons Gevorg (Georgi) and Yulius Tamanian also became noted architects and continued their father's work.

Tamanian died in Yerevan on February 20, 1936, and is buried at the Komitas Pantheon which is located in the city center of Yerevan.

Buildings
Aghasi Khanjian’s mansion, Hrazdan River gorge – 1920s
Andrei Sakharov Square – 1924 – Nalbandyan St., Pushkin St., Vardanants St.
Freedom Square – Mashtots Av., Teryan St., Sayat-Nova St. – 1924-1939
Republic Square – 1926-1977
University Observatory - Student Park (between Abovyan and Teryan streets) – 1926
First Hydroelectric Power Plant – Left bank of Hrazdan River – 1926
State Medical University – Koryun St. – 1927-1955
Institute of Zoology and Veterinary – Nalbandyan St. – 1928
Hospital of Obstetrics and Gynecology – Abovyan St. – 1929
Institute of Physiotherapy – Abovyan St. – 1930, 1932, 1939
Engineering University - Teryan St. – 1932, 1935
University of Architecture and Construction – Teryan St. – 1935
Children's Hospital – Abovyan St. – 1939
National Academic Opera and Ballet Theatre – Freedom Square – 1933, 1940, 1953
Government House – Republic Square – 1941, 1952

Projects

Tamanian also designed the layout of many towns and cities in Armenia, such as:
Yerevan
Nor Arabkir town
Nubarashen, 1926
Ejmiatsin
Stepanakert, 1926

Notes

References
Armenian Soviet Encyclopedia, v. 1, 1974 Yerevan

Ethnic Armenian architects
Russian people of Armenian descent
Architects from the Russian Empire
Soviet architects
People from Krasnodar
1878 births
1936 deaths
Burials at the Komitas Pantheon
20th-century Armenian architects